Benjamin Thomson (8 June 1913 – 12 November 1940) was a Scottish professional footballer who played as a winger in the Scottish Football League for Kilmarnock. He featured in both matches of the replayed 1938 Scottish Cup Final, scoring in the second (the last of eight he scored in the competition, including two in the semi-final victory over Rangers) although his side lost 4–2 to East Fife.

Personal life
Thomson was married and served as a fireman and trimmer in the Merchant Navy during the Second World War. Posted aboard the steamer , he was killed in action when the ship was sunk by German aircraft in the North Atlantic Ocean at position . Thomson is commemorated on the Tower Hill Memorial.

Career statistics

References

1913 births
1940 deaths
People from Saltcoats
Footballers from North Ayrshire
Scottish footballers
Association football outside forwards
Kilmarnock F.C. players
Kilwinning Rangers F.C. players
Third Lanark A.C. wartime guest players
British Merchant Navy personnel of World War II
Royal Navy sailors
British civilians killed in World War II
Deaths due to shipwreck at sea
Deaths by airstrike during World War II
Scottish Junior Football Association players
Scottish Football League players